Kutman Wine Museum is a privately held museum devoted to winemaking, which was established in 2004 by the Kutman Winery at Mürefte, Şarköy of Tekirdağ Province, Turkey.

Kutman Wine Museum was founded in 2004 by the third-generation executives Adnan and Cahit Kutman of the Kutman Winery, which is one of the five wineries in Mürefte village of Şarköy, Tekirdağ. It is housed in a building next to the residence, where the family had lived between the early 1900s and 1976.
The museum exhibits singed joists of the 1928-burnt old residence building, wine production records of the last eighty years, weighing scales from the Ottoman period, mechanical crusher, mechanical destemming machine, must pump, big  wooden wine barrels, bottle corking machine and dusty wine bottles.

References

Museums in Tekirdağ Province
Wine museums
Museums established in 2004
2004 establishments in Turkey
Mürefte